Mélanie is a French solid rocket motor, 16 cm in diameter. The first version was used as first stage of the Monica rocket.

It had a thrust increasing from 6.2 kN (Monica I) to 8.2 kN (Monica V) and a burn time of about five seconds. Melanie was later used in several ATEF and ONERA rockets. In the ONERA rockets, such as Daniel, Antares and Berenice, Melanie was placed inside a 22 cm diameter cylindrical housing. This version delivered a total impulse of 48 kN.s with about 22 kilograms of propellant.

References

External links
Monica rockets
ONERA rockets
Melanie rocket engine

Rockets and missiles